was a Japanese film director and screenwriter. One of the foremost directors within the Japanese New Wave, his films include In the Realm of the Senses (1976), a sexually explicit film set in 1930s Japan, and Merry Christmas, Mr. Lawrence (1983), about World War II prisoners of war held by the Japanese.

Early life

After graduating from Kyoto University in 1954, where he studied political history, Ōshima was hired by film production company Shochiku Ltd. and quickly progressed to directing his own movies, making his debut feature A Town of Love and Hope in 1959.

1960s
Ōshima's cinematic career and influence developed very swiftly, and such films as Cruel Story of Youth, The Sun's Burial and Night and Fog in Japan followed in 1960. The last of these 1960 films explored Ōshima's disillusionment with the traditional political left, and his frustrations with the right, and Shochiku withdrew the film from circulation after less than a week, claiming that, following the recent assassination of the Socialist Party leader Inejiro Asanuma by the ultranationalist Otoya Yamaguchi, there was a risk of "unrest". Ōshima left the studio in response, and launched his own independent production company. Despite the controversy, Night and Fog in Japan placed tenth in that year's Kinema Jumpo best-films poll of Japanese critics, and it has subsequently amassed considerable acclaim abroad.

In 1961 Ōshima directed The Catch, based on a novella by Kenzaburō Ōe about the relationship between a wartime Japanese village and a captured African American serviceman. The Catch has not traditionally been viewed as one of Ōshima major works, though it did notably introduce a thematic exploration of bigotry and xenophobia, themes which would be explored in greater depth in the later documentary Diary of Yunbogi, and feature films Death by Hanging and Three Resurrected Drunkards. He embarked upon a period of work in television, producing a series of documentaries; notably among them 1965's Diary Of Yunbogi. Based upon an examination of the lives of street children in Seoul, it was made by Ōshima after a trip to South Korea.

Ōshima directed three features in 1968. The first of these - Death by Hanging (1968) presented the story of the failed execution of a young Korean for rape and murder, and was loosely based upon an actual crime and execution which had taken place in 1958. The film utilizes non-realistic "distancing" techniques after the fashion of Bertold Brecht or Jean-Luc Godard to examine Japan's record of racial discrimination against its Korean minority, incorporating elements of farce and political satire, and a number of visual techniques associated with the cinematic new wave in a densely layered narrative. It was placed third in Kinema Jumpo 1968 poll, and has also garnered significant attention globally. Death By Hanging inaugurated a string of films (continuing through 1976's In the Realm of the Senses) that clarified a number of Ōshima's key themes, most notably a need to question social constraints, and to similarly deconstruct received political doctrines.

Months later, Diary of a Shinjuku Thief unites a number of Ōshima's thematic concerns within a dense, collage-style presentation.  Featuring a title which alludes to Jean Genet's The Thief's Journal, the film explores the links between sexual and political radicalism, specifically examining the day-to-day life of a would-be radical whose sexual desires take the form of kleptomania. The fragmented narrative is interrupted by commentators, including Kara Jūrō's underground performance troupe, starring Kara Jūrō, his then wife Ri Reisen, and Maro Akaji (who would go on to lead the butoh troupe Dairakudakan). Yokoo Tadanori, an artist who created many of the iconic theatre posters during the 1960s and '70s, plays the thief, who gets a bit part in Kara's performance. The film also features a psychoanalyst, the president of Kinokuniya Bookstore in Shinjuku, and an impromptu symposium featuring actors from previous Ōshima films (along with Ōshima himself), all dissecting varied aspects of shifting sexual politics, as embodied by various characters within the film.

Boy (1969), based on another real-life case, was the story of a family who use their child to make money by deliberately getting involved in road accidents and making the drivers pay compensation.

1970s
The Ceremony (1971) is a satirical look at Japanese attitudes, famously expressed in a scene where a marriage ceremony has to go ahead even though the bride is not present.

In 1976, Ōshima made In the Realm of the Senses, a film based on a true story of fatal sexual obsession in 1930s Japan. Ōshima, a critic of censorship and his contemporary Akira Kurosawa's humanism, was determined that the film should feature unsimulated sex and thus the undeveloped film had to be transported to France to be processed. An uncensored version of the movie is still unavailable in Japan. Ōshima testified in a Japanese court about whether the film was obscene. "Nothing that is expressed is obscene," the director said. "What is obscene is what is hidden."

In his 1978 companion film to In the Realm of the Senses, Empire of Passion, Ōshima took a more restrained approach to depicting the sexual passions of the two lovers driven to murder, and the film won the 1978 Cannes Film Festival award for best director.

1980s and beyond
In 1983 Ōshima had a critical success with a film made partly in English, Merry Christmas, Mr. Lawrence, set in a wartime Japanese prison camp, and featuring rock star David Bowie and musician Ryuichi Sakamoto, alongside Takeshi Kitano. The movie is sometimes viewed as a minor classic but never found a mainstream audience. Max, Mon Amour (1986), written with Luis Buñuel's frequent collaborator Jean-Claude Carrière, was a comedy about a diplomat's wife (Charlotte Rampling) whose love affair with a chimpanzee is quietly incorporated into an eminently civilised ménage à trois.

For much of the 1980s and 1990s, he served as president of the Directors Guild of Japan. He won the inaugural Directors Guild of Japan New Directors Award in 1960.

A collection of Ōshima's essays and articles was published in English in 1993 as Cinema, Censorship and the State. In 1995 he wrote and directed the archival documentary '100 Years of Japanese Cinema' for the British Film Institute. A critical study by Maureen Turim appeared in 1998.

In 1996 Ōshima suffered a stroke, but he recovered enough to return to directing in 1999 with the samurai film Taboo (Gohatto), set during the bakumatsu era and starring Merry Christmas, Mr. Lawrence actor Takeshi Kitano. Ryuichi Sakamoto, who had both acted in and composed for Lawrence, provided the score.

He subsequently suffered more strokes, and Gohatto proved to be his final film. Ōshima had initially planned to create a biopic entitled Hollywood Zen based on the life of Issei actor Sessue Hayakawa. The script had been allegedly completed and set to film in Los Angeles, but due to constant delays, declining health, and Ōshima's eventual death in 2013 (see below), the project went unrealized.
 
Ōshima had a degree of fluency in English. In the 2000s, he worked as a translator, translating four volumes by John Gray into Japanese, including Men Are from Mars, Women Are from Venus.

Ōshima died on January 15, 2013, of pneumonia. He was 80.

The 2013 edition of the San Sebastian Film Festival scheduled a retrospective of Ōshima films in September.

Awards

Filmography

Films

Television

Film theorists
Film scholars who have focused on the work of Ōshima include Isolde Standish, an Australian and British Humanities Scholar and Film theorist specialised in East Asia. She teaches courses on Ōshima at the School of Oriental and African Studies in London and wrote extensively on him as for example:
Politics, Porn and Protest: Japanese Avant-Garde Cinema in the 1960s and 1970s. New York: Continuum Int. Publishing Group.
'Transgression and the Politics of Porn. Ōshima Nagisa's In the Realm of the Senses (1976)'. In: Phillips, A. and Stringer, J., (eds.), Japanese Cinema: Texts and Contexts. Abingdon: Routledge, pp 217-228).

Writings
Pasolini Renaissance,

Translations
"Ai ga Fukamaru Hon - "Honto no Yorokobi" o shiru tame ni" (translation of "Making Heart-to-Heart Love in Bed" by John Gray) 
ベスト・パートナーになるために―男と女が知っておくべき「分かち愛」のルール 男は火星から、女は金星からやってきた (translation of "Men Are from Mars, Women Are from Venus" by John Gray)

Notes

References

External links
OSHIMA PRODUCTIONS LTD

 Profile at Japan Zone
 

1932 births
2013 deaths
Kyoto University alumni
Film theorists
Japanese film directors
Obscenity controversies in film
People from Kyoto
Cannes Film Festival Award for Best Director winners
Recipients of the Medal with Purple Ribbon